Briar Woods High School is a public secondary school located in Ashburn, an unincorporated area in Loudoun County, Virginia, United States, and is part of Loudoun County Public Schools. The school serves students who live in the Broadlands, Brambleton, and Waxpool communities.

History
Briar Woods High School opened on August 29, 2005 with its student body coming from Stone Bridge High School, Loudoun County High School, and Eagle Ridge Middle School.  The first Principal was Edward Starzenski, who served as principal of Loudoun County High School from 1989 to 2004. The school was officially dedicated on October 14, 2005 at a ceremony presided over by school district superintendent Edgar B. Hatrick III. In 2006, Briar Woods celebrated its first Homecoming, despite the lack of a returning class.

During the summer before the 2011-2012 school year, ten trailers were installed due to an increased enrollment for the year. The following school year, a new order of lockers were put in the school in order to accommodate the rising number of students attending the school. In the 2014-2015 school year, Students living in Loudoun Valley Estates and most of Brambleton were shifted to Rock Ridge High School to relieve overcrowding. This dropped Briar's enrollment by about 500 students.

Demographics

In 2006-2007 Briar Woods High School's student population was 67% White; 16% Asian; 10% Black; and 7% Hispanic.

As of 2018, the student population was 53.6% White, 26.4% Asian, 8.5% Hispanic, 5.8% two or more races, and 5.7% Black.

As of 2019. the student population was 52.1% White, 28.3% Asian, 7.9% Hispanic, 6.5% two or more races, and 5.0% Black.

As of the 2021-2022 school year, the student population was 48.6% White, 31.4% Asian, 8.3% Hispanic, 5.8% two or more races, and 5.5% Black.

Curriculum
See Main Discussion: Loudoun County Public Schools – Curriculum

Briar Woods is a fully accredited high school by the Virginia Department of Education.

School rankings

In 2011, Briar Woods was recognized by Newsweek as one of America's best high schools. It was ranked 1st in Loudoun County, 4th in the state of Virginia and 112th in the country. In 2016, it was ranked the 10th best school in Virginia and is currently unranked in the National Ranking.

Athletics
Briar Woods is a member of Conference 14 and competes in Division 5A North.

State championships
 Football
{| class="wikitable collapsible collapsed" width=650px
|+
!colspan=7 align=center bgcolor=""|Football State Championship Games
|-
!align=center| Year
!colspan=2 align=center| Winning Team
!colspan=2 align=center| Losing Team
!align=center| Location (all in Virginia)
!align=center| Class
|-
|2010
| Briar Woods
| 41
| Harrisonburg
| 21
| Liberty University, Lynchburg
| AA Div. 4
|-
|2011
| Briar Woods
| 28
| Christiansburg
| 26
| Liberty University, Lynchburg
| AA Div. 4
|-
|2012
| Briar Woods
| 52
| Heritage High School (Lynchburg, Virginia)
| 0
| Liberty University, Lynchburg
| AA Div. 4
|}
 Cheerleading
{| class="wikitable collapsible collapsed" width=650px
|+
!colspan=7 align=center bgcolor=""|Cheerleading State Championships
|-
!align=center| Year
!colspan=2 align=center| Winning Team
!colspan=2 align=center| Losing Team
!align=center| Class
|-
|2009
| Briar Woods
| 261
| Brentsville
| 255
| AA
|-
|2010
| Briar Woods
| 282
| William Byrd
| 274
| AA
|-
|2011
| Briar Woods
| 259
| Tabb High School
| 245
| AA
|-
|2012
| Briar Woods
| 279
| Grafton High School (Virginia)
| 277
| AA
|-
|}
 Softball
{| class="wikitable collapsible collapsed" width=650px
|+
!colspan=7 align=center bgcolor=""|Softball State Championship Games
|-
!align=center| Year
!colspan=2 align=center| Winning Team
!colspan=2 align=center| Losing Team
!align=center| Class
|-
|2011
| Briar Woods
| 9
| Woodgrove
| 1
| AA
|}

Soccer

In 2017, the men's Briar Woods High School soccer team won the State Championship (Briar Woods 1 - Mills Godwin 0).

Feeder pattern 
for the 2021-2022 school year:

 Eagle Ridge Middle School
 Hillside Elementary School
 Mill Run Elementary School
 Waxpool Elementary School

Notable alumni

Alex Carter, cornerback for the Seattle Seahawks
Trace McSorley, Arizona Cardinals quarterback

References

Citations

Sources

External links
Official Website
Loudoun County Public Schools website

Public high schools in Virginia
Schools in Loudoun County, Virginia
Educational institutions established in 2005
2005 establishments in Virginia